Reynier van Gherwen or Gherwen (1620 – 1662) was a Dutch Golden Age painter from Leiden best known as a pupil of Rembrandt.

Gherwen was born in Leiden and became a member of the Confrerie Pictura in 1659.

Gherwen died in Leiden.

References

1620 births
1662 deaths
Artists from Leiden
Dutch Golden Age painters
Dutch male painters
Painters from The Hague
Pupils of Rembrandt